Pierre Houde (born July 14, 1957) is a Canadian play-by-play sports announcer for RDS. He has announced broadcasts of Montreal Canadiens games since 1989. Over the years he was partnered with Pierre Bouchard and Yvon Pedneault. From 2007 to 2011, his partner was former Canadiens' player Benoît Brunet. In 2009, Joël Bouchard was his and Brunet's partners, but when Bouchard left for the Blainville-Boisbriand Armada in 2011, he was replaced by former NHL goaltender Marc Denis. Houde also broadcasts Formula One Races at the same station along with Bertrand Houle.

Houde's goal call is "Le tir, et le but!" ("A shot, and a goal!") after every Canadiens goal, though depending on the moment he stretches "but" out for as long as ten seconds. Other calls are "Eh bien, coup de théâtre, ma parole!" which he often uses when unbelievable situations occur and "Les rouges s'éteignent... et on roule!!" at the start of a Formula One Grand Prix.

Houde does hockey play by plays on Le Hockey Du Samedi Soir, Le Hockey Du Mardi Soir, Le Hockey Du Jeudi Soir and any other days the Canadiens play.

Houde has acquired a fairly large following among the Canadiens' anglophone fans, many of whom watch his telecasts rather than those on Hockey Night in Canada. According to a 2020 poll by The Athletic, 44.5 percent of Canadiens fans watch Houde's broadcasts, a figure that The Athletic attributed to large Anglophone viewership.

Houde is fluently bilingual in both English and French. However, he has only called two games in English. When Dino Soto, the English play-by-play announcer for the Canadiens on CJAD, was unable to get back to Montreal from a party to celebrate the station's 50th anniversary, he asked Houde to step in and to call CJAD's broadcast of the Canadiens' game against the Detroit Red Wings on December 2, 1995. Houde reluctantly agreed, as no other experienced anglophone broadcaster was available. The Canadiens lost that game in an 11–1 rout that proved to be Patrick Roy's last game with the team before being traded to the Colorado Avalanche. The second came when he called a Canadiens game against the Pittsburgh Penguins on RDS' anglophone sister, The Sports Network. Houde had previously been considered for the play-by-play spot with the Avalanche.

Houde started his broadcasting career at CKOI-FM as a weekend DJ when he was 20 years old and still going to École des hautes études commerciales de Montréal (HEC Montréal).

His first sports broadcasting was doing half-time NFL broadcasts in French as a freelancer. Houde was one of the original staff at RDS when it started in September 1989.

Houde is from Saint-Laurent, Quebec, now a borough in the city of Montreal.

He shares his life with Lyne Couture since summer 2018.

References

External links 
 

Living people
Canadian sports announcers
Canadian television sportscasters
Montreal Canadiens announcers
Motorsport announcers
National Hockey League broadcasters
People from Saint-Laurent, Quebec
1957 births